Martin Podhráský (born 11 October 1983) is a Czech sport shooter and physician. He won two gold medals, and eventually set a new world record of 583 points in the men's rapid fire pistol (RFP) at the 2011 ISSF World Cup series in Sydney, Australia, and in Changwon, South Korea.

Podhrasky represented the Czech Republic at the 2008 Summer Olympics in Beijing, where he competed in the men's 25 m rapid fire pistol, along with his teammate Martin Strnad. He placed fourteenth out of nineteen shooters in the qualifying rounds of the event, with a total score of 565 points (276 on the first stage, and 289 on the second).

At the 2012 Summer Olympics in London, Podhrasky finished only in seventh place, and thereby missed out of the final round in the men's 25 m rapid fire pistol by one point behind Germany's Christian Reitz from the second stage, for a total score of 583 targets.

References

External links
 
 
 
 NBC Olympics Profile

Czech male sport shooters
Living people
Olympic shooters of the Czech Republic
Shooters at the 2008 Summer Olympics
Shooters at the 2012 Summer Olympics
Sportspeople from Prague
1983 births
European Games competitors for the Czech Republic
Shooters at the 2015 European Games
Shooters at the 2019 European Games